John Key (born 5 November 1937) is a former professional association footballer who played as a half back or winger. He started his career as a junior at Fulham and played professionally for the club between 1958 and 1966, playing 163 league matches and scoring 29 goals. He made 181 appearances in all competitions for Fulham, scoring 37 goals. He moved to Coventry City in 1966, where he played 28 matches and scored 7 goals in two seasons. He ended his career in 1969 after a two-year spell at Leyton Orient, which saw him play just 10 matches.

References

1937 births
Footballers from Kensington
Association football midfielders
Coventry City F.C. players
Fulham F.C. players
Leyton Orient F.C. players
Living people
English footballers